Minsk County may refer to
Mińsk County
Minsk County (Minsk Governorate)